Carlos Aguilera (1 January 1945 – 19 May 2009) was a Uruguayan theater director.

Biography

His debut as a theater director came in 1968 with three works at El Galpón: Señora Carrar's Rifles by Bertolt Brecht, The Zoo Story by Edward Albee and Los de la mesa 10 by Osvaldo Dragún; and with Los papeleros by Isidora Aguirre at the Theater Club. He directed works by García Lorca, Ibsen, Arthur Miller, Florencio Sánchez, Carlos Gorostiza, Griselda Gambaro, Julio César Castro, and others.

He won the Florencio Award several times and received the International Theater Prize from UNESCO.

Beginning in 1983 he had a career of more than 20 years in Paraguay, as a theater teacher and director, linked in particular to the Harlequin Theater where he put on more than 40 productions. There he directed works by Shakespeare, Molière, Anton Chekhov, García Lorca, Arthur Miller, Tennessee Williams, Brecht, etc., as well as Paraguayan and other Latin American authors.

He was a theater teacher in several cities of the interior (Canelones, Colonia, Durazno, Maldonado, Minas, San José) and in the 1990s he formed the Theater Studies Institute. He was artistic director of the Casa de Comedias del Uruguay of the Ministry of Education and Culture. He directed the Municipal Comedy and the Municipal School of Dramatic Art in San José, and beginning in 1986 he was itinerant director of Colonia Department.

During his last months of life he worked as a theater teacher at the Club Biguá de Villa Biarritz and prepared the play The Price by Arthur Miller at the El Galpón Theater. His death occurred while he was in charge of the direction of  El hombre que quería volar by Carlos Manuel Varela, at Espacio Teatro.

References

1945 births
2009 deaths
People from Montevideo
Uruguayan theatre directors